Covington County Schools is a public school district based in Covington County, Mississippi, which serves the towns of Collins, Seminary, and Mount Olive, as well as rural regions throughout the county. The district’s boundaries parallel that of Covington County.

History

The first public school established in Covington County was in the Salem community. Little is known about the date of establishment, only that a Mr. James Hill led instruction. The legislature of Covington County passed an act in 1837 which created the now-defunct Male and Female Academy in present day Mt. Carmel. In subsequent years, the legislature created the Male and Female College (1841) in Williamsburg, Mississippi and the Zion Seminary College (1846) at the present day site of Seminary Attendance Center. In the past, Covington County School District consisted of over 100 small, rural schools. So many schools caused problems regarding funding, with superintendent N. B. Holcomb reporting in 1895 that "funds are so divided as to place so little to each school that it don't [sic] amount to much after it is placed". Holcomb also noted that there were no secondary education schools located in the county, although the district planned for their development. In the report to the Mississippi Department of Education, superintendent N. B. Holcomb also reports that the introduction of a Teachers' Institute and Teachers' Library into the district was "the most factor in enabling teachers to secure prompt attendance and good deportment". He states that most successful teachers in the school district were the ones who used the least amount of corporal punishment.

Desegregation
Throughout much of the history of Covington County, the school system was under de jure segregation. On December 12, 1966, the United States Department of Justice filed a case against the school district to challenge a "freedom of choice" school desegregation plan in place, which was combined in a suit against 25 other districts. A report from the Mississippi Sovereignty Commission dated July 7, 1967 relays the situation in Mount Olive, saying:

Eventually, on November 7, 1969, the courts issued an order to desegregate the county schools. In 1970, sixteen years after the Supreme Court's decision in Brown vs. Board of Education, the Covington County School District began integration of all its schools, with the exception of Hopewell Elementary. There was a small demonstration of approximately 25 parents, who gathered in front of three schools to picket the decision to integrate schools, as well as white students who stayed home. However, there was little white flight or protest in response to the move, in spite of "an effort [by Citizens for Local Control of Education] to get 1,000 mothers in ... Covington County to picket against the massive integration orders..." (Bolton, 2007).

Eventually, the case returned to the court system when it was discovered that 25 white students in the Hopewell zone were not attending the school. The Fifth Circuit required the district to modify attendance requirements so that all students in Hopewell would attend the school. After no activity for almost 30 years, the Department of Justice filed a motion for further relief that required Covington County Schools not use race for selection in extracurricular activities and develop non-discrimination policies to govern this. In addition, a settlement between the Department of Justice and Covington County Schools led to five major provisions which the county must follow:

 Students in Hopewell Attendance zone attend Hopewell for grades K-6 and Seminary Attendance Center for grades 7-12
 Publicize its majority-to-minority transfer program, which allows students in the majority race at a school to transfer to one where they are a minority
 Establish an enrichment program at Hopewell to "enhance education" and "encourage white students in other attendance zones" to transfer there
 Conduct facilities organization study and submit plans to build or renovate Seminary schools to the United States
 Analyze all bus routes for Hopewell Attendance center to reduce time spent on buses as much as possible

The Department of Justice received annual reports from the school district throughout the 2010s. The case remains open as of April 2017.

Lawsuits

Covington County School District vs. G. W., a minor 
On December 4, 1998, a teacher reported to the assistant principal that G. W., a student at Seminary High School, had been drinking beer in the school parking lot. The assistant principal and school resource officer investigated and found empty beer cans in a toolbox on the back of the student's truck. When questioned, the student admitted that it was his alcohol. G. W. received a parental contact and five-day suspension. On December 8, a letter was sent to the family concerning an expulsion hearing to occur on December 17. At the hearing, G. W. was officially expelled from Seminary for the remainder of the school year and placed in the district's alternative school. The family appealed to the Chancery Court, which reversed the district's decision.

The Mississippi Supreme Court upheld the school board decision and reversed the Chancery Court. The official conclusion, according to FindLaw (COVINGTON COUNTY v. G.W., a Minor., 2000), stated:

"The school district's failure to follow the procedures set forth in the handbook, while problematic, did not deny G.W. any substantive or due process rights under the Fourth and Fourteenth Amendments to the United States Constitution. Any possible due process violations were cured when G.W. received the second formal hearing. Additionally, we find the search of G.W.'s automobile by a school official, while on school property, did not violate the search and seizure clause of the Fourth Amendment. Therefore, this Court reverses and renders the decision of the Covington County Chancery Court and reinstates the decision of the Covington County School District."

Other lawsuits 
 Covington County School District vs. Lutricia Magee
 Doe vs. Covington County School District

Schools

Notable events

1985 Teacher strike 
Along with teachers in Lamar County, Forrest County, and Stone County, instructors in Covington County participated in a strike against the Governor and Legislature, calling for the state to raise teacher salaries by $7,000 over two years. This occurred in spite of a restraining order against the strike, which was originally endorsed by the Mississippi Educator's Association. The endorsement was eventually rescinded, and the MEA joined the Mississippi American Federation of Teachers to advise against the strike.

Math Institute 

During the 2003–04 school year, as part of a project under No Child Left Behind, the University of Southern Mississippi selected Covington County Schools as one of eleven school districts to participate in its Math Institute. At the end, the hope was that the program would lead to a lower percentage of students scoring at the minimal and basic level on state achievement tests.

Adoption of CHART program 
In 2012, the Covington County School Board adopted the CHART policy to teach sexual education. Mississippi First reports that this move allows "all [Covington County] public school students in grades 6-9 ... access to evidence-based sex education this fall." The adoption raised the number of Mississippi school districts participating in CHART to 30.

SPEPA Adopt-A-School Program 
In 2017, Southern Pine Electric Power Association began a program to adopt various schools in their service areas, choosing Hopewell Elementary as the first school to participate. The elementary school will receive volunteers for projects and donations of school supplies. Under the new program, Southern Pine employees will work with teachers, parents, and community members to provide needed resources for students and young people.

Accountability statistics

Mississippi Academic Achievement Program Scores 
Until the 2017-2018 school year, Covington County Schools, as a whole, had consistently maintained a C average on the Mississippi Academic Achievement Program. The most recent results placed the district at a D level, in contrast to the C ratings from previous school years. The 2017-2018 assessment data indicates that the majority of schools in the county are rated at a D or lower, following the trend from the 2016-2017 school year. During the 2015-2016 school administration, the number of schools receiving a C or higher was exactly half of the number of schools receiving a D or lower. These are in contrast to previous years, which had the majority of schools in the county rated as a C or higher. The top three performing schools in the county are Collins High School, Seminary High School, and Seminary Elementary School, which all obtained a B as of the most recent assessments.

Four-year graduation rates 

According to a report by the Division of Research and Development at the Mississippi Department of Education, the school district's current graduation rates for general education students, 77.2%, are below Mississippi's 6-year average of 82.3%. However, district drop-out rates for general education students, at 10.5%, are slightly lower than the state's six-year average of 10.8%. Regarding students with disabilities, the graduation rate is 13.8%, significantly below the statewide graduation rate of 34.7%. The document does not mention drop-out rates for students with disabilities.

Demographics

Financial 
According to Empower Mississippi, Covington County Schools spent approximately $8,578.36 per student in the 2013-2014 school year. During the 2017-2018 school year, the district received $1,396,764 in Title I funds. The Mississippi Department of Revenue lists the school district millage rate is 36.31 out of 85.75 total mills; this accounts for 42.34 percent of millage taxes in Covington County.

Racial 
The most recent racial demographic data for the district's available on the NCES website. According to it, during the most recent information available, the racial composition of the overall district was as follows:

See also
List of school districts in Mississippi

References

External links

Education in Covington County, Mississippi
School districts in Mississippi